List of towns where there is a trinquet at the moment or there has been in the past. Bolded are the active trinquets.

In Valencia city 

 Trinquet de Cavallers, at the street of that name.
 Trinquet de Centelles, in the 16th century.
 Trinquet d'En Ciurana, cited in 1571, at the Plaça de la Mercé.
 Trinquet de l'Encarnació.
 Trinquet dels Faigs, according to the Llibre d'Aveïnaments, 1505.
 Trinquet de l'Hospital, next to the Porta del Reial and close to the bridge with the same name.
 Trinquet de Juan de Mena, end of the 19th century and first half of the 20th century.
 Trinquet Llevant del Grau, end of the 19th century and first half of the 20th century.
 Trinquet de Mossén Olcina, cited in 1484.
 Trinquet de Mossén Sanz.
 Trinquet del Pavorde, according to the Llibre d'Aveïnaments, 1505.
 Trinquet de Pelayo. The only one active right now.
 Trinquet dels Pilons or dels Mascons, because the owners were the Mascons family. Located at the Carrer Ruiz de Lihory, cited in 1534.
 Trinquet del Trabuquet. It was known as Trinquet del Bordell dels Negres before, and also as Trinquet de Mossén Cots. Cited in 1525.
 Trinquet de Na Segarra. Placed at the Carrer de la tertúlia. It was called Trinquet de la Morera in the 18th century.
 Polytechnic University of Valencia's trinquet.

Around the Valencian Community 
 Abdet, 1772, resembling to galotxetes courtfield.
 Aielo de Malferit
 Alicante
 Alberic
 Albuixec
 Alcàsser
 Alcoy
 Aldaia
 Alfarb
 Algemesí
 Alginet
 Almassora
 Almoines
 L'Alqueria d'Asnar
 Altea
 Alzira
 Bèlgida
 Bellreguard
 Benaguasil
 Benasau
 Beniarjó
 Beniarrés
 Benidorm
 Benifaió
 Benigànim
 Benimantell
 Benimarfull
 Beniopa
 Beniparrell
 Benissa
 Benissanó
 Bétera
 Bicorp (Under construction)
 Bocairent
 Borbotó
 Borriana
 Borriol
 Burjassot
 Calpe
 El Campello
 Canals
 Carcaixent
 Càrcer
 Carlet
 Casinos
 Castalla
 Castellar
 Castelló de la Plana
 Castelló de la Ribera
 Castelló de Rugat
 Catarroja
 Confrides
 Crevillent
 Daimús
 Dénia
 Elda
 L'Eliana
 Elche
 Foios
 Gandia
 Gata de Gorgos
 El Genovés
 Godelleta
 Guadassuar
 Jesús Pobre
 Llíria
 La Llosa de Ranes
 Llutxent
 Manises
 Massalfassar
 Massamagrell
 Meliana
 Moncofa
 Monòver
 Montcada
 Murla
 Muro d'Alcoi
 Museros
 Oliva
 L'Olleria
 Onda
 Ondara
 Onil
 Ontinyent
 Orba
 L'Orxa
 Palma de Gandia
 Parcent
 Paterna
 Pedreguer
 Pego
 Petrer
 Piles
 La Pobla de Vallbona
 Polinyà de Xúquer
 Quatretonda
 Rafelcofer
 Real de Gandía
 Real
 Riba-roja de Túria
 Sagunt
 Silla
 Simat de la Valldigna
 Sollana
 Sueca
 Tavernes de la Valldigna
 Torrent
 Traiguera
 Les Useres
 La Vila Joiosa
 València
 Vall d'Ebo
 La Vall d'Uixó
 Vilafamés
 Villalonga
 Vilamarxant
 Vila-real
 La Vilavella
 Villar del Arzobispo
 Xàbia
 Xaló
 Xelva
 Xeraco
 Xeresa
 Xest
 Xilxes

Abroad 

Argentina:
 San Juan

See also 

 List of the Valencian pilotaris

Valencian pilota